The flag of the Arab Revolt, also known as the flag of Hejaz, was a flag used by the Arab nationalists during the Arab Revolt against the Ottoman Empire during World War I, and as the first flag of the Kingdom of Hejaz.

History

It has been suggested that the flag was designed by the British diplomat Sir Mark Sykes, in an effort to create a feeling of "Arab-ness" in order to fuel the revolt. According to Stanford University historian Joshua Teitelbaum, this claim is made both by Sykes' 1923 biographer and by Hussein ibn Ali al-Hashimi, who in 1918 told Woodrow Wilson that it symbolished Hashemite rule over the Arab world. According to one version, Sykes, keen to challenge the French flag being flown in French-controlled Arab territories, offered several designs to Hussein, who chose the one that was then used. However, the flag is highly reminiscent of earlier flags used by Arab nationalists, such as those used by Al-Muntada al-Adabi in 1909, Al-ʽAhd (Iraq) in 1913, and the Al-Fatat secret society in 1914.

Although the Arab Revolt was limited in scope and supported by the British, the flag influenced the national flags of a number of emerging Arab states after World War I. Flags inspired by that of the Arab revolt include those of Palestine, Jordan, Egypt,  Iraq, Kuwait, Sudan, Syria, Yemen, Somaliland, the Sahrawi Arab Democratic Republic and Libya.

The horizontal colors stand for the Abbasid (black), Umayyad (white) and Rashidun (green) caliphates. The red triangle has been described as referring to the Hashemite dynasty, or the ashraf of Mecca. According to Tim Marshall, white was the Umayyad colour in memory of Mohammed's first military victory, black was the Abbasid colour to mark a new era and to mourn the dead of the Battle of Karbala, and green was the colour of the Prophet's coat and of his followers as they conquered Mecca. Alternatively, the colours' symbolism has been described as follows: white for the Damascene Umayyad period, green for the Caliph Ali, red for the Khawarij movement, and black for the Prophet Mohammed, showing the "political use of religion" in opposition to the increasingly secularized Turkish colonial rule. Similarly, Marshall explains the use of the European tricolor as a sign of the break with the Ottoman past, while the colours are deeply Islamic without using the star and crescent used by the Ottomans. The explanation given in the official note of the ceremony marking the first anniversary of the Revolt, celebrating Hussein's decree on the adoption of the flag, was that black represented the Black Standard of the Prophet (the al-ʻuqāb, eagle), his companions and the Abbasid empire, the green represented the Prophet's family (Ahl al-Bayt), white various Arab rulers, and red the Hashemites.

The Hashemites were allies of the British in the conflict against the Ottoman Empire. After the war ended, the Hashemites achieved or were granted rule in the Hejaz region of Arabia, Jordan, formally known as the Hashemite Kingdom of Jordan, Iraq, and briefly in Syria.

The Arab Kingdom of Syria was dissolved after only a few months of existence after the French conquest in 1920. The Hashemites were overthrown in the Hejaz in 1925 by the Sultanate of Najd after the Saudi conquest of Hejaz, and in Iraq in 1958 by a coup d'etat, but retained power in Jordan.

A 60 m × 30 m version of the flag currently flies from the Aqaba Flagpole, currently the seventh tallest freestanding flagpole in the world, located in Aqaba, Jordan.

Description
The flag contains the four Pan-Arab colors: black, white, green and red. There are three horizontal stripes: black, green, and white, going down the flag. There is also a red triangle on the hoist side of the flag.

See also
 Flag of Saudi Arabia
 Flag of the Ba'ath Party

References

External links
 https://www.britannica.com/topic/Arab-Revolt-Flag

Arab Revolt
Arab nationalist symbols
Arab history
Political flags
Historical flags